The Choir may refer to:

 The Choir (alternative rock band), a Christian rock band formed in California, originally known as Youth Choir.
 The Choir (garage rock), a 1960s rock band from Cleveland, Ohio, originally known as The Mods.
 The Choir (EP), an EP by the above group.
 The Choir (TV series), a British television documentary series about choir singing starring Gareth Malone.
 The Choir (web series), a dramedy by Issa Rae about a Black church choir 
 The Choir, a 1988 novel by British author Joanna Trollope.
 The Choir, a 1995 BBC mini series starring Anthony Way, based on Joanna Trollope's novel.
 The Choir, a radio programme about choral music on BBC Radio 3 presented by Aled Jones.

See also
 Choir (disambiguation)
 The Choirboys (disambiguation)